Glava is a village situated in Arvika Municipality, Värmland County, Sweden with 201 inhabitants in 2005.

References 

Populated places in Värmland County